The Bridgeport Bridge also known as the Wheeling and Belmont bridge (per the dedication plaque affixed to the structure) was a bridge which once carried U.S. Route 40 (US 40) over the back channel of the Ohio River between Wheeling Island, West Virginia, and Bridgeport, Ohio.

The steel-framed bridge, with a wooden deck, was built in 1893 to replace a prior wooden covered bridge that was built on the same site circa 1836. In fact, the 1893 bridge utilized the same piers that were built for the earlier bridge. The primary reason for construction of the new bridge was to accommodate the new electric streetcars that were being deployed in Wheeling. The bridge's traffic moved to an alternative bridge in 1998 and the bridge was demolished in 2011.

The bridge was documented by the Historic American Engineering Record program, which provided the following description of its significance in approximately 1987:In 1987 or so, there were plans for the building of a replacement vehicular bridge nearby, upstream.  It was expected that the Bridgeport bridge would remain as a pedestrian and bicycle bridge.

The wooden bridge deck was replaced in 1950 with steel grating, and the streetcar tracks were removed, as interurban rail service was discontinued in 1948. By 1987, the floor beams had become structurally unsound for automobile traffic due to extensive corrosion. A self-supporting, load-bearing deck structure, known as a Bailey Truss, was installed inside the trusses of the Bridgeport Bridge. This was only a temporary measure, as the bridge was replaced in 1998 with the adjacent Military Order of the Purple Heart Bridge. Sometime in 2009 much of the temporary Bailey Truss was removed. It is unclear if the steel grate floor had been removed prior to the installation of the Bailey Truss, but after the removal of its floor structure the Bridgeport Bridge was without a floor.

In 2009, it was announced that the bridge would be demolished, and the cost of demolishing the bridge was estimated to be less than $200,000.

Early in the summer of 2011, WTOV-TV in Steubenville reported that the bridge was to be demolished, with demolition tentatively scheduled to start at the end of July 2011. They reported that the West Virginia Division of Highways received a request from the U.S. Coast Guard to bring the bridge down as it was a safety hazard and pieces had fallen into the river. It also verified that many of the unique features of the bridge, such as the railings, signage, the finials on top, and plaques would be removed prior to demolition. The bridge demolition was expected to take 60 days and cost $750,000.00, which was considerably less than a $1.2 million estimate for demolition costs that had been given in 2000.

Explosive demolition of the bridge occurred on Monday, September 12, 2011. Explosive charges were used to drop the bridge into the river, after which cranes began retrieving the steel parts for scrapping. Complete removal of bridge and piers was scheduled to be completed by October 31, 2011.

See also
List of bridges documented by the Historic American Engineering Record in Ohio
List of bridges documented by the Historic American Engineering Record in West Virginia
List of crossings of the Ohio River

Sources

External links

Bridgeport Bridge at Bridges & Tunnels

Demolished buildings and structures in Ohio
Demolished buildings and structures in West Virginia
Bridges over the Ohio River
Bridges completed in 1893
Buildings and structures demolished in 2011
Historic American Engineering Record in Ohio
Historic American Engineering Record in West Virginia
Road bridges in Ohio
Railroad bridges in Ohio
Road bridges in West Virginia
Railroad bridges in West Virginia
Demolished bridges in the United States
Steel bridges in the United States
Buildings and structures in Wheeling, West Virginia
Bridges in Belmont County, Ohio
Interstate vehicle bridges in the United States